St. Francis Xavier (1506–1552) is a Catholic saint.

St. Francis Xavier may also refer to:

Places
 St. François Xavier, Manitoba, Canada
 Saint-François-Xavier, Paris, France, a church
 Saint-François-Xavier (Paris Métro)
 San Francisco Javier, El Salvador
 São Francisco Xavier, São Paulo state, Brazil
 São Francisco Xavier, Rio de Janeiro, Brazil
 São Francisco Xavier (Lisbon), Portugal

People
 Francis Xavier Bianchi (1743–1815), Italian priest and scholar
 Frances Xavier Cabrini (1850–1917), Italian-American nun

Other uses
 St. Francis Xavier Church (disambiguation)
 St. Francis Xavier School (disambiguation)
 List of schools named after Francis Xavier, various colleges and schools
 St. Francis Xavier University, in Antigonish, Nova Scotia, Canada

See also
 St. Francis (disambiguation)
 St. Xavier (disambiguation)
 San Xavier (disambiguation)
 Xavier (disambiguation)
 San Javier (disambiguation)
 "San Franciscu Xavier-a, tuji kudd-i Goeam xara", a Konkani hymn
 Forte de São Francisco Xavier de Tabatinga, Brazil